Mycterocera is a genus of flies in the family Stratiomyidae.

Distribution
Argentina.

Species
Mycterocera contigua James, 1967

References

Stratiomyidae
Brachycera genera
Diptera of South America
Endemic fauna of Argentina